Aleksandr Sergeyevich Panayotov (born 1 July 1984) is a Russian-Ukrainian singer and songwriter. He has recorded two albums so far. In January 2023, Ukraine imposed sanctions on Aleksandr for his support of 2022 Russian invasion of Ukraine.

Eurovision Song Contest
Aleksandr had made eleven previous attempts to represent Russia or Ukraine so far

Russia 
 2005: Balalayka (with Alexey Chumakov) – 5th (11.6% of televoting)
 2006: Didn't qualify to the first round
 2007: Не моя (Every Little Thing) (with Alexey Chumakov) – 2nd
 2008: Crescent and Cross – 2nd (52 points)
 2009: Superhero – Didn't qualify to the national final
 2010: Maya Showtime – 6th (10.6 points)
 2017: Aleksandr was shortlisted
 2019: Aleksandr was shortlisted
 2020: Aleksandr was shortlisted – 3rd
 2021: Aleksandr was shortlisted

Ukraine 
 2009: Superhero – 4th (22 points)

The Voice of Russia 2016 
The Voice performances
 – Studio version of song reached the top performances that week

Awards
 2003 – Received prize "Красная книга Запорожья (Redlist of Zaporizhzhia)"
 2006 – Received gold medal "Во имя жизни на земле (In name of life on land)" (Moscow)
 2007 – Received Order "Служение искусству (Merit for art)" (Moscow)
 2010 – Received Order "Пламенеющее сердце(Flaming Heart)" (Moscow)

Performance-related pay
 2000 – World song contest "Черноморские игры (Blacksea's play)"  Grand-prix
 2000 – Song contest "Славянском базаре (Slavic bazar)" 3rd  (Kyiv)
 2000 – Song contest "Азовские паруса  (Sail of Azov)" 1st (Azov)
 2001 – Song festival "Золотой шлягер (Golden hit songs)" 1st (Mogilev)
 2001 – Song contest "Дискавери (Discovery)" 1st (Varna, Bulgaria)
 2001 – Song contest "Море друзей (Sea of friends)" 1st (Yalta)
 2001 – Song contest "Конкурс артистов эстрады (Contest of pop-artists)" 2nd (Kyiv)
 2002 – Song contest "Песни Вильнюса (Songs of Vilnius)" 1st (Latvia)
 2002 – Song contest "Стань звездой (Become star)" advanced till final-stage (tele-channel "Россия (Russia)")
 2003 – Song contest "Народный артист (National artist)" 2nd (tele-channel "Россия")

Discography

Albums
 2006 – Леди дождя (The Rain lady)
 2010 – Формула любви (Formula of love)

Compilation albums
 2001 – Слухай@zp.ua (First disk, in which the song was written by A.Panayotov – "Літній дощ (Summer rain)")
 2004 – Народный артист 1 (National artist 1)
 2004 – Народный артист 2 (National artist 2)
 2004 – Финальный концерт проекта в Кремле (Final concert of project in Kremlin) – DVD
 2005 – Балалайка (Balalaika)
 2005 – Народный артист (National artist) – mp3
 2005 – Народный артист необыкновенный (National artist wonderful)
 2006 – Мальчишник (Bachelor party)
 2006 – Все звезды поют песни Кима Брейтбурга (All stars are singing the songs of Kim Breitburg)
 2006 – "Фабрика Звезд" против "Народный Артист" ("Star factory" vs "National artist")

Videoclips
 2005 — Необыкновенная(Wonderful lady, with Ruslan Alekhno & Alexey Chumakov)
 2005 — Балалайка(Balalaika, with А.Chumakov)
 2007 — Голос(Voice)
 2010 — Формула любви(Formula of love)
 2011 — Till tomorrow

Notes

References

External links 

  www.panaiotov.ru
 Aleksandr Panayotov discography, album releases & credits at Discogs
 Aleksandr Panayotov albums to be listened as stream on Spotify

1984 births
Living people
Singers from Saint Petersburg
People from Zaporizhzhia
Ukrainian pop singers
Idols (franchise) participants
21st-century Ukrainian male singers